Budapest–Újszász–Szolnok railway line is the number 120a line of the MÁV. It is a double track, electrified track, which is part of the international rail system. It goes on as Line number 120, which connects Budapest, Békéscsaba, Lökösháza, Arad (in Romania). The line from Budapest to Szolnok is 100 km long.

Track 
Starting from Budapest as far as Rákos, it runs on the same track as the 80a line. Here it turns to south-southwest, crosses the plain of Pest and the south part of the hills of Gödöllő. Its route follows the Tápió and Zagyva rivers, crossing at Újszász. Here it meets with lines 82 and 86, and runs on the same track. The track rises between Budapest and Gyömrő, then descends to Tápiószecső. Between Tápiószecső and Szolnok it runs on mainly flat terrain.

History 
It was opened for traffic on 12 March 1882. It was an important line of that period, because the other line connecting the two cities were privately owned by StEG and MÁV needed a track owned by itself which would connect Józsefváros railway station with Szolnok. Later it was expanded up to the Keleti railway station. Line was electrified in 1969. There were huge changes in the early 2000s. New rails came to the track, lines between Rákos and Maglód as well as between Sülysáp and Tápiószecső and between Újszsz and Szolnok were renovated. Some stations were renovated as well. Rebuilding of the line between Tápiószecső and Nagykáta was finished in 2008.

MÁV charged MÁVÉPCEL Kft for the renovation of the line. It was funded from loan issued by the EBRD. As part of the Új Magyrország (New Hungary) improvement plan, there were built P+R and B+R parking places: to the stations of the following villages, towns: Gyömrő, Sülysáp, Tápiószecső, Szentmártonkáta, Nagykáta. There are cameras which safeguard the vehicles.

Traffic 
It is one of the busiest suburban rail lines of the country. Its characteristic is that mainly the whole traffic is made of the travelling to and from working. As a result, line is heavily used in rush-hours.

Since 10 December 2006 there is a clock-face scheduling on the line. As a result there is express train in every two hours to Békéscsaba, there is regional train to Szolnok, which does not stop to Sülysáp, except at Rákos and Kőbánya-felső. Since 12 December  2010 there is regional train between Budapest and Sülysáp in working days twice, on public holidays once in an hour. These stop at every stations and stops. In rush hours of working days there is a fast regional train between Budapest and Nagykáta. These run hourly. To the capital, both regional and zoning trains run in every 20 minutes. As of today, there is no service at Abonyi út station at the line.

Rolling stock
There are MÁV V43 and MÁV V63 locomotives on the line. Since 2010 there are some MÁV 1047 and ÖBB 1116, Taurus rails as well. Later ones are operated by Rail Cargo Hungaria. There are EuroNight-, EuroCity-, InterCity-, express-, regional freight trains, LoLa as well. Regional trains are usually made up by 5 coaches and one locomotive. These are usually push-pull trains. Most of them are Bhvs reconstructed in Dunakeszi by Bombardier.

Since the autumn of 2012 there is some FLIRT stock as well, which was produced by Stadler.

References

External links 

 Fényképek a vonalról
 A vonal menetrendje a MÁV honlapján
 Virtuális 120a Train Simulator alá

Railway lines in Hungary